Gianluca Carpani (born 29 August 1993) is an Italian footballer who plays as a midfielder for  club Recanatese.

Club career
On 30 January 2019, he joined Rieti on loan.

On 12 August 2019, he signed a 2-year contract with Serie C club Fano.

On 9 September 2021, he joined Montevarchi Aquila.

On 9 July 2022, he moved to Recanatese.

References 

1993 births
Living people
People from Ascoli Piceno
Sportspeople from the Province of Ascoli Piceno
Footballers from Marche
Italian footballers
Association football midfielders
Serie B players
Serie C players
Serie D players
A.S. Sambenedettese players
Ascoli Calcio 1898 F.C. players
F.C. Rieti players
Alma Juventus Fano 1906 players
Montevarchi Calcio Aquila 1902 players
U.S.D. Recanatese 1923 players